Peter McRobbie (born 31 January 1943) is a Scottish-born American character actor, best known for his roles as John C. Twist in the 2005 romantic drama film Brokeback Mountain, Mike Sheenan in the 2006 action film 16 Blocks, Pop Pop Jamison in the 2015 horror film The Visit and Father Paul Lantom in Daredevil, as well as recurring roles in the TNT series The Alienist and as Judge Walter Bradley in the Law & Order franchise.

Early life
McRobbie was born in Hawick, Scottish Borders, Scotland, the son of Mary Fleming (née Heigh), a writer, and William McRobbie, a storekeeper. In the early 1950s, he moved with his parents to the United States, where he became an American citizen.

He attended Yale Drama School, from which he graduated in 1966. He then studied in graduate school at the University of Tulsa for one year and studied acting with German-American actress Uta Hagen and actor James Saito at HB Studios in New York City.

From 1966 to 1968, McRobbie served in the United States Army and was stationed at Fort Sill, Oklahoma and became a Specialist 5.

Career
In 1969, he moved to New York City to pursue an acting career, but was unable to find work. He supported himself as an advertiser throughout the early 1970s, and actually pitched the original idea for the "Jell-O Pudding Cup". By the summer of 1975, he had found stage work with John Astin and Patty Duke in California. However, he moved back to the East Coast after the production ended.

McRobbie has appeared in more than 60 movies and television series to his credit.  The movies include Spider-Man 2, Find Me Guilty, World Trade Center, 16 Blocks, Big, Shaft, Sleepers, and Bullets over Broadway.  He had a recurring role on the TV series Law & Order: Special Victims Unit and the original Law & Order series. It was on these two shows that McRobbie has played perhaps his most famous role to date, Judge Walter Bradley. In 2000, he played the role of Father Felix in "From Where to Eternity", the 9th episode of the second season of The Sopranos, and again in 2001 in "Proshai, Livushka" the second episode of the third season of the HBO hit series. McRobbie also garnered wide attention for his portrayal of John C. Twist in the motion picture Brokeback Mountain (2005).

From 2010 to 2013 McRobbie played the role of FBI Supervisor Frederick Elliot in 9 episodes of the HBO hit series Boardwalk Empire. McRobbie plays George H. Pendleton in Lincoln (2012), as Lincoln's most virulent and snarling opponent in the House of Representatives in relation to the constitutional amendment outlawing slavery. He also appeared in the film Inherent Vice (2014), M. Night Shyamalan's movie The Visit (2015), and Steven Spielberg's Bridge of Spies (2015). From 2015 to 2018, McRobbie also portrayed Father Paul Lantom in the Netflix series Daredevil.

Personal life
On 10 September 1977, McRobbie married actress Charlotte McRobbie (née Bova) and he has two children.

Filmography

Film

Television

References

External links

1943 births
Living people
United States Army soldiers
People with acquired American citizenship
People from Hawick
Yale University alumni
Yale School of Drama alumni
Scottish emigrants to the United States
Scottish male film actors
Scottish male television actors
American male film actors
American male television actors
American male voice actors
20th-century American male actors
21st-century American male actors
 University of Tulsa alumni